Carlos Zambrano (born 1981) is a Venezuelan former Major League Baseball pitcher.

Carlos Zambrano may also refer to:

Carlos Zambrano (boxer) (born 1984), Peruvian boxer
Carlos Zambrano (footballer) (born 1989), Peruvian centre-back
Carlos Contreras Zambrano (born 1995), Chilean footballer

See also
Zambrano (surname)